Peter Burgess (born 13 June 1984) is a New Zealand former professional basketball player. Born in Timaru, Canterbury, Burgess played for the Otago Nuggets in 2008 and the Southland Sharks in 2010. He also played numerous years in the second division Conference Basketball League, including the Otago A team in 2008 and the Southland Flyers in 2010.

References

External links
 Eurobasket.com profile

1984 births
Living people
New Zealand men's basketball players
Sportspeople from Timaru
Point guards
Otago Nuggets players
Southland Sharks players
20th-century New Zealand people
21st-century New Zealand people